Francis Brewer Richardson (14 November 1897 – 11 May 1970) was an Australian rules footballer who played with Melbourne in the Victorian Football League (VFL).

Notes

External links 

1897 births
Australian rules footballers from Victoria (Australia)
Melbourne Football Club players
1970 deaths